Timothy Patrick Blaney (born April 23, 1959) is an American puppeteer and voice actor. He has provided the voices for Frank the Pug in Men in Black, Men in Black II, and Men in Black: International, and the self-aware robot "Johnny 5" in Short Circuit and Short Circuit 2.

Filmography

Films

Short film

TV series

Events

Video games

References

External links

1959 births
Living people
American puppeteers
American male voice actors